Smogorzewo Włościańskie is a village in the administrative district of Gmina Winnica, within Pułtusk County, Masovian Voivodeship, in east-central Poland.

References

Villages in Pułtusk County